Thandorf is a municipality in the Nordwestmecklenburg district, in Mecklenburg-Vorpommern, Germany, European Union.

References

Nordwestmecklenburg